Pa-Hng (also spelled Pa-Hung;  Bāhēng yǔ) is a divergent Hmongic (Miao) language spoken in Guizhou, Guangxi, and Hunan in southern China as well as northern Vietnam.

Classification
Pa-Hng has long been recognized as divergent. Benedict (1986) argued that one of its dialects constituted a separate branch of the Miao–Yao family. Ratliff found it to be the most divergent Hmongic (Miao) language that she analyzed. This Bahengic branch also includes Younuo (Yuno) and Wunai (Hm Nai).

Names
Pa-Hng speakers are called by the following names (Mao & Li 1997).
 (巴哼)
 (唔奈)
Red Yao (红瑶)
Flowery Yao (花瑶)
Eight Surname Yao (八姓瑶)

In Liping County, Guizhou, the Dong people call the Pa-Hng  (嘎优), while the Miao people call them  (大达优). In Tongdao County, Hunan, the Pa-Hng are also known as the Seven Surname Yao 七姓瑶, since they have the seven surnames of Shen 沈, Lan 兰, Dai 戴, Deng 邓, Ding 丁, Pu 蒲, and Feng 奉.

In China, Pa-Hng speakers are classified as Yao, even though their language is Hmongic rather than Mienic.

Varieties
Mao & Li (1997) splits Pa-Hng into the following subdivisions, and most closely related to Hm Nai:
Pa-Hng proper (巴哼 )
Northern
Southern
Hm Nai (唔奈 )

Vocabulary word lists for these three Pa-Hng varieties can be found in Mao & Li (1997). An additional dialect is found in Vietnam.
Northern Pa-Hng: Gundong 滚董, Liping County 黎平, Guizhou
Southern Pa-Hng: Wenjie 文界, Sanjiang County 三江, Guangxi
Hm Nai: Huxingshan 虎形山, Longhui County 隆回, Hunan

The Na-e dialect (also known by the Vietnamese rendition of Pa-Hng, Pà Then [Pateng]), is a geographic outlier. Paul Benedict (1986) argued that it is not actually Pa-Hng, or even Hmongic, but a separate branch of the Miao–Yao language family. However, Strecker (1987) responded that it does appear to be a Pa-Hng dialect, though it has some peculiarities, and that Pa-Hng as a whole is divergent.

Jerold A. Edmondson has reported Pa-Hng dialects in Bac Quang District and Hong Quang Village of Chiem Hoa District in northern Vietnam, and found that they were most closely related to the Pa-Hng dialect spoken in Gaoji Township 高基, Sanjiang County, Guangxi.

Distribution

China
Pa-Hng speakers are distributed in the following counties in China. Most of the counties have 1,000 - 6,000 Pa-Hng speakers (Mao & Li 1997).

Hunan
Longhui County, Shaoyang (Hm-Nai speakers)
Hm-Nai: Huxingshan 虎形山乡, Xiaoshajiang 小沙江乡, Motang 磨塘乡, Dashuitian 大水田乡
Dongkou County, Shaoyang (Hm-Nai speakers)
Chenxi County, Huaihua (Hm-Nai speakers)
Xupu County, Huaihua (Hm-Nai speakers)
Tongdao County, Huaihua (Hm-Nai speakers): 1,779 people (2000), in Chuansu Township 传素瑶族乡 and Linkou Township 临口镇 (in Shangdong 上洞村 and Xiadong 下洞村 villages). Highly endangered status.
Chengbu Miao Autonomous County, Shaoyang
Xinning County, Shaoyang
Suining County, Shaoyang (100+ speakers)
Guizhou
Liping County
Northern Pa-Hng: Gundong 滚董乡, Shunhua 顺化乡
Congjiang County
Southern Pa-Hng: Gaomang 高忙乡
Guangxi
Rongshui County (12,000+ speakers)
Northern Pa-Hng: Dalang 大浪乡, Danian 大年乡, Antai 安太乡, Dongtou 洞头乡, Gunbei 滚贝乡, Wangdong 汪洞乡, Gandong 杆洞乡; Huaibao 怀宝镇
Southern Pa-Hng: Baiyun 白云乡, Dalang 大浪乡, Anchui 安陲乡, Xiangfen 香粉乡
Sanjiang County
Northern Pa-Hng: Tongle 同乐乡, Laobao 老堡乡
Southern Pa-Hng: Wenjie 文界乡, Liangkou 良口乡
Longsheng County
Southern Pa-Hng: Sanmen 三门乡, Pingdeng 平等乡
Lingui County
(13 other counties)

Vietnam
 
Pa-Hng is also spoken in small pockets of northern Vietnam. In Vietnam, the Pa-Hng are an officially recognized ethnic group numbering around a few thousand people, where they are called Pà Thẻn. Na-e as reported by Bonifacy (1905) is also found in northern Vietnam.

Tân Trịnh, Quang Bình District, Hà Giang Province, Vietnam (Niederer 1997, 2004)
Bắc Quang District, Hà Giang Province, Vietnam
Minh Thương Village, Tân Lập Township
Tân Thịnh Township
Hồng Quang Village, Chiêm Hoá District, Tuyên Quang Province (62 km northwest of Chiêm Hoá City), where the speakers are known as Mèo Hoa (Flowery Miao)

According to Vu (2013:12-15), the ancestors of the Pà Thẻn had first migrated from Guangxi to Hải Ninh (now Quảng Ninh Province), and then from Hải Ninh to the Thái Nguyên area. The Pà Thẻn then split off to settle in three main areas.
Linh Phú (Chiêm Hoá District, Tuyên Quang) and Trung Sơn (Yên Sơn District, Tuyên Quang)
Lăng Can (Na Hang District, Tuyên Quang), Hồng Quang (Chiêm Hoá District, Tuyên Quang), and Hữu Sản (Bắc Quang District, Hà Giang)
From Xuân Minh (Quang Bình District, Hà Giang), the Pà Thẻn migrated to the communes of Yên Bình, Yên Thành, Tân Trịnh, Tân Nam (all in Quang Bình District, Hà Giang) and Tân Lập (Bắc Quang District, Hà Giang).

Phonology

Consonants 

 Alveolar sounds  are heard as retroflex  in the Laobao dialect.

Vowels 

See also
Pa-Hng comparative vocabulary list (Wiktionary)

References

 Mao Zongwu [毛宗武], Li Yunbing [李云兵]. 1997. A study of Pa-Hng [巴哼语研究]. Shanghai: Shanghai Far East Publishing House [上海远东出版社].

External links
 Pa-Hng and Hm Nai comparative vocabulary list on Wiktionary (6 dialects compared)
 ABVD: Pa-Hng (Gundong) word list
 Hm Nai of Longhui County, Hunan
 Yao of Malin Township, Xinning County, Hunan
https://web.archive.org/web/20131202224052/http://cema.gov.vn/modules.php?name=Content&op=details&mid=524

Hmongic languages
Languages of China
Languages of Vietnam